The Men's omnium was held on 16–17 October 2015. 20 riders competed across six events.

Results

Scratch race
Standings after 1 event.

Individual pursuit
Standings after 2 events.

Elimination race
Standings after 3 events.

1km time trial
Standings after 4 events.

Flying lap
Standings after 5 events.

Points race and final standings
Riders' points from the previous 5 events were carried into the points race, in which the final standings were decided.

References

Men's omnium
European Track Championships – Men's omnium